Sergio Portillo is a Venezuelan-American painter, sculptor, and illustrator best known for using paints that have human ashes in them.

References

Year of birth missing (living people)
Living people